Al Khayat, El Khayat, al-Khayyat may refer to:

Sidi Abdallah Al Khayat, a small town and rural commune in Meknès Prefecture of the Fès-Meknès region of Morocco
Abdullah Al Khayat, Emirati doctor, hospital director
Rita El Khayat, Moroccan psychiatrist, anthro-psychoanalyst, writer, and anthropologist
Abu Ali al-Khayyat,

See also
Khayat

Occupational surnames